Noël Soumah (born 21 December 1994) is a Senegalese professional footballer who plays as a centre-back.

Honours 
WS Brussels

 Belgian Second Division: 2015–16

Westerlo

 Belgian First Division B: 2021–22

References

External links
 

1994 births
Living people
Footballers from Dakar
Association football goalkeepers
Senegalese footballers
ASC Yeggo players
R.W.D.M. Brussels F.C. players
RWS Bruxelles players
K.A.A. Gent players
K.V.C. Westerlo players
Challenger Pro League players
Senegalese expatriate footballers
Expatriate footballers in Belgium
Senegalese expatriate sportspeople in Belgium